Joseph Kirkley (13 April 1903 – 14 February 1971) was an Australian rules footballer who played with North Melbourne in the Victorian Football League (VFL).

Notes

External links 

1903 births
1971 deaths
Australian rules footballers from Victoria (Australia)
North Melbourne Football Club players